Yip Yip Yippy is a 1939 Fleischer Studios animated short film. The short was the final official Betty Boop cartoon in the Paramount Picture series. Although this was billed as a Max Fleischer cartoon/a Betty Boop cartoon, Betty Boop herself did not appear. Despite her non-appearance, this is the last official Betty Boop cartoon in the Paramount series.

Premise
A drugstore cowboy reads a dime novel and imagines himself as an Old West cowboy battling a cattle rustler.

References

1939 animated films
Betty Boop cartoons
1930s American animated films
American black-and-white films
1939 short films
Paramount Pictures short films
Short films directed by Dave Fleischer
Fleischer Studios short films
1930s English-language films
American animated short films
1930s Western (genre) comedy films
American Western (genre) comedy films
Western (genre) animated films
American comedy short films